Joe Turner is the name of:
 Big Joe Turner (1911–1985), blues singer
 Joe Turner (jazz pianist) (1907–1990), jazz/stride pianist
 Joe Lynn Turner (born 1951), rock musician
 Joe Turner (footballer, born 1872) (1872–1950), English football winger for Southampton, Stoke and Everton
 Joe Turner (footballer, born 1931), English football goalkeeper for Stockport, Darlington, Scunthorpe and Barnsley
 Joe Turner (ice hockey) (1919–1944 or 1945), Canadian hockey player
 Joe Turner (writer), British writer
 Joe M. Turner (born 1969), American magician and speaker

Fictional characters
 a character  in the play Joe Turner's Come and Gone
 a fictional CIA analyst

See also
 Joseph Turner (disambiguation)